JDHS  may refer to:
 Jaap de Hoop Scheffer, Dutch politician and Secretary General of NATO
 Jamesville-Dewitt High School, Central New York
 Jeff Davis High School, Hazelhurst, Georgia
 John Dewey High School, Brooklyn, New York
 John Dickinson High School, Wilmington, Delaware
 Jonathan Dayton High School, Springfield, New Jersey
 Juneau-Douglas High School, Juneau, Alaska